Adam Kappacher  (born 15 December 1993) is an Austrian freestyle skier. He competed in the 2017 FIS Freestyle World Ski Championships, and in the 2018 Winter Olympics.

References

External links

1993 births
Living people
Austrian male freestyle skiers
Olympic freestyle skiers of Austria
Freestyle skiers at the 2018 Winter Olympics
Freestyle skiers at the 2022 Winter Olympics